Rachel Gibson (born 1961) is an American author of contemporary romance novels.

Biography
With the publication of her first novel in 1998, Simply Irresistible, Gibson became a New York Times and USA Today bestselling author. She has also won a RITA award, The Golden Heart Award, the National Reader's Choice, Amazon Editor's Top Pick, Publisher Weeklys Quill nominee, and Borders bestselling romantic comedy for 2006.

Awards
The Trouble With Valentine's Day: Borders Books Best Romantic Comedy 2006
True Confessions: 2002 RITA Awards Best contemporary Novel winner
Not Another Bad Date: 2009 RITA Award Best Contemporary Novel winner

Bibliography

Single novels
Drop Dead Gorgeous (2022) 
How Lulu Lost Her mind (2020)
Truly Madly Yours (1999)
It Must Be Love (2000)
True Confessions (2001)
Lola Carlyle Reveals All (2002)
Blue By You (2013)
What I Love About You (2014)
Just Kiss Me (2016)

Chinooks Hockey Team series
Simply Irresistible (1998)
See Jane Score (2003)
The Trouble with Valentine's Day (2005)
True Love and Other Disasters (2009)
Nothing But Trouble (2010)
Any Man of Mine (2011)
The Art of Running In Heels (2017)

Lovett, Texas
Daisy's Back in Town (2004)
Crazy On You (2012)
Rescue Me (2012)
Run To You (2013)
I Do! (2015)

Writers series 
Sex, Lies, and Online Dating (2006)
I'm in No Mood for Love (2006)
Tangled Up In You (2007)
Not Another Bad Date (2008)

Anthologies in collaboration
"I Do!" (2014)
"Blue By You" (2013)
 "Now and Forever" in Secrets on a Perfect Night December 2000 (with Victoria Alexander and Stephanie Laurens)

References

 

20th-century American novelists
21st-century American novelists
American romantic fiction writers
American women novelists
Living people
Writers from Boise, Idaho
RITA Award winners
Women romantic fiction writers
20th-century American women writers
21st-century American women writers
Novelists from Idaho
1961 births